Majo (masc.) or maja (fem.), also manolo and manola, after the most popular names, were people from the lower classes of Spanish society, especially in Madrid, who distinguished themselves by their elaborate outfits and sense of style in dress and manners, as well as by their cheeky behavior. 
They flourished from the late 18th to early 19th century, and to some extent later. Majos and majas were one of the favorite subjects of some 19th-century Spanish painters.

The majos and majas outfits were exaggerations of traditional Spanish dress. The style stood in strong contrast to the French styles affected by many of the Spanish elite under the influence of the Enlightenment. Majos were known to pick fights with those they saw as afrancesados ("Frenchified" – fops).

In Spanish, the word possesses derived forms such as chulapo and chulapa, a version of chulo and chula in reference to their saucy attitude, as well as chispero and chispera, among others.

Popularity
Although majos of both sexes were frequent subjects of painter Francisco Goya, two of his majas, La maja vestida and La maja desnuda (the same model, naked), would gain international renown. 

The outfit of the maja would influence the costume of the eponymous protagonist of Georges Bizet's French opera Carmen in the mid-19th century.

In the 20th century, with the popularization of Spain as a tourist destination, the manola or maja, often holding a folding fan, increasingly gained recognition as the image of a stereotypical traditional Spanish woman. Thus the maja became one of the popular and informal symbols of Spain, along with the bullfighter, who took the place of the majo. Some of the 20th-century depictions of the maja became somewhat assimilated into the flamenco dancer (la bailaora). Nowadays, the increasing popularity of the maja has ended up eclipsing that of the majo.

The image of a maja was the trademark of the Jabón Maja Myrurgia soap, one of the classical souvenirs from Spain. The brand's portrait of the maja in the soap boxes and wrappings was based on the person of Carmen Tórtola Valencia (1882–1955), a famous Spanish dancer of the early 20th century.

Gallery

See also
Guappo
Apaches
Cholo
Chicano

References

External links

Los castizos madrileños
Chulapona de Madrid (Chotis) - Manolo Escobar
Tópicos andaluces en el cine contemporáneo: de la españolada al poscostumbrismo
Carmen Tórtola Valencia, pasión por el coleccionismo

History of Madrid
Spanish culture
Subcultures